Ray Phillips may refer to:

Ray Phillips (musician) (born 1949), Welsh rock drummer, original member of Budgie
Ray Phillips (American football) (born 1954), NFL player
Ray Phillips (cricketer) (born 1954), Australian cricketer
Raymond Phillips (Jamaican cricketer) (1900–1970), Jamaican cricketer
Raymond Phillips (judge) (1915–1982), British judge
Ray (Ramon) Phillips (born 1939), Welsh singer, member of The Nashville Teens
Ray Phillips, American amateur boxer, List of US national Golden Gloves champions
Ray Phillips, character in the Belizean TV drama, Noh Matta Wat!